Emperor Wu of Jin (236 – 16 May 290), personal name Sima Yan, courtesy name Anshi (安世), was a grandson of Sima Yi, nephew of Sima Shi and son of Sima Zhao. He became the first emperor of the Jin dynasty after forcing Cao Huan, last emperor of the state of Cao Wei, to abdicate to him.  He reigned from 266 to 290, and after conquering the state of Eastern Wu in 280, was the emperor of a reunified China. Emperor Wu was also known for his extravagance and sensuality, especially after the unification of China; legends boasted of his incredible potency among ten thousand concubines.

Emperor Wu was commonly viewed as a generous and kind, but also wasteful. His generosity and kindness undermined his rule, as he became overly tolerant of the noble families' (世族 or 士族, a political/bureaucratic landlord class from Eastern Han to Tang dynasty) corruption and wastefulness, which drained the people's resources. Further, when Emperor Wu established the Jin Dynasty, he was concerned about his regime's stability, and, believing that the predecessor state, Cao Wei, had been doomed by its failures to empower the princes of the imperial clan, he greatly empowered his uncles, his cousins, and his sons with authority, including independent military authority. This ironically led to the destabilization of the Western Jin, as the princes engaged in an internecine struggle known as the War of the Eight Princes soon after his death, and then the Wu Hu uprisings that nearly destroyed the Western Jin and forced its successor, Eastern Jin, to relocate to the region south of the Huai River.

Life before establishment of the Jin Dynasty
Sima Yan was born to Sima Zhao and his wife Wang Yuanji, daughter of the Confucian scholar Wang Su, in 236, as their oldest son. At that time, Sima Zhao was a mid-level official in the government of Cao Wei and a member of a privileged clan, as the son of the general Sima Yi. After Sima Yi seized power from the regent Cao Shuang in 249 in the Incident at Gaoping Tombs, Sima Zhao became more influential in the state. After his father's death in 251, Sima Zhao became the assistant to his brother, the new regent Sima Shi. After Sima Shi died in 255, Sima Zhao became regent and the paramount authority in the Wei government.

Sima Yan's first important appearance in history was in 260, when forces loyal to his father, led by Jia Chong, defeated an attempt by the Wei emperor Cao Mao to take back power and killed Cao Mao. At that time, as a mid-level army general, he was commissioned by his father to escort the new emperor Cao Huan from his dukedom to the capital Luoyang. After his father was created the Duke of Jin on 9 December 263 in light of the army's conquest of Shu Han, he was named heir. However, at times Sima Zhao hesitated as to whether Sima Yan or his brother Sima You would be the more appropriate heir—as Sima You was considered talented and had also been adopted by Sima Shi, who had no biological sons of his own, and Sima Zhao, remembering his brother's role in the Simas' takeover of power, thought it might be appropriate to return power to his branch of the clan. However, a number of high level officials favored Sima Yan, and Sima Zhao agreed. After he was created the King of Jin on 2 May 264 (thus reaching the penultimate step towards usurpation), Sima Yan was created the Crown Prince of Jin.

On 6 September 265, Sima Zhao died without having formally taken imperial authority. Sima Yan became the King of Jin by the next day. On 4 February 266, he forced Cao Huan to abdicate, ending the state of Cao Wei. Four days later, on 8 February 266, he declared himself emperor of the Jin dynasty.

As Emperor of Jin

Early reign: establishment of the Jin political system
Emperor Wu immediately sought to avoid what he saw as Cao Wei's fatal weakness—lack of power among the imperial princes. In 265, immediately after taking the throne, he made princes of many of his uncles, cousins, brothers, and sons, each with independent military commands and full authority within their principalities. This system, while it would be scaled back after the War of the Eight Princes and the loss of northern China, would remain in place as a Jin institution for the duration of the dynasty's existence, and would be adopted by the succeeding Southern dynasties as well.

Another problem that Emperor Wu saw with Cao Wei's political system was its harshness in penal law, and he sought to reform the penal system to make it more merciful—but the key beneficiaries of his changes turned out to be the nobles, as it quickly became clear that the mercy was being dealt out in an unequal manner. Nobles who committed crimes often received simple rebukes, while there were no meaningful reductions in penalties for commoners. This led to massive corruption and extravagant living by the nobles, while the poor went without government assistance. For example, in 267, when several high level officials were found to have worked in conjunction with a county magistrate to seize public land for themselves, Emperor Wu refused to punish the high level officials while punishing the county magistrate harshly.

Emperor Wu faced two major military issues almost immediately—incessant harassment from the rival Eastern Wu's forces, under emperor Sun Hao, and Xianbei and Qiang rebellions in Qin (秦) and Liang (涼) provinces (modern Gansu). Most officials were more concerned about the Xianbei and Qiang rebellions and also with another non-Han people—the Xiongnu, who had settled down in modern Shanxi after the dissolution of their state by Cao Cao in 216 under the watchful eyes of Chinese officials, and were feared for their military abilities. These officials advised Emperor Wu to try to suppress the Xianbei and the Qiang before considering conquests of Eastern Wu. Under the encouragement of the generals Yang Hu and Wang Jun and the strategist Zhang Hua, however, Emperor Wu, while sending a number of generals to combat the Xianbei and the Qiang, prepared the southern and eastern border regions for war against Eastern Wu throughout this part of his reign.  He was particularly encouraged by reports of Sun Hao's cruelty and ineptitude in governing Eastern Wu; indeed, the officials in favor of war against Eastern Wu often cited this as reason to act quickly, as they argued that Eastern Wu would be harder to conquer if and when Sun Hao was replaced. However, after a major revolt by the Xianbei chief Tufa Shujineng started in 270 in Qin Province, Emperor Wu's attention became concentrated on Tufa, as Tufa was able to win victory after victory over Jin generals. In 271, the Xiongnu noble Liu Meng (劉猛) rebelled as well, and while his rebellion did not last long, this took Emperor Wu's attention away from Eastern Wu. In 271, Jiao Province (交州, modern northern Vietnam), which had paid allegiance to Jin ever since the start of his reign, was recaptured by Eastern Wu. In 272, the Eastern Wu general Bu Chan, in fear that Sun Hao was going to punish him on the basis of false reports against him, tried to surrender the important city of Xiling (西陵, in modern Yichang, Hubei) to Jin, but Jin relief forces were stopped by the Eastern Wu general Lu Kang, who then recaptured Xiling and killed Bu. In light of these failures, Yang took another tack—he started a détente with Lu and treated the Eastern Wu border residents well, causing them to view Jin favorably.

When Emperor Wu ascended the throne in 265, he honored his mother Wang Yuanji as empress dowager. In 266, he also honored his aunt Yang Huiyu (Sima Shi's wife) an empress dowager, in recognition of his uncle's contributions to the establishment of the Jìn Dynasty.  He made his wife Yang Yan empress the same year.  In 267, he made her oldest living son, Sima Zhong crown prince—based on the Confucian principle that the oldest son by an emperor's wife should inherit the throne—a selection that would, however, eventually contribute greatly to political instability and the Jin Dynasty's decline, as Crown Prince Zhong appeared to be developmentally disabled and unable to learn the important skills necessary to govern. Emperor Wu further made perhaps a particularly fateful choice on Crown Prince Zhong's behalf—in 272, he selected Jia Nanfeng, the strong-willed daughter of the noble Jia Chong, to be Crown Prince Zhong's princess.  Crown Princess Jia would, from that point on, have the crown prince under her own tight control. Before Empress Yang died in 274, she was concerned that whoever the new empress would be, she would have ambitions to replace the crown prince, and therefore Empress Yang asked Emperor Wu to marry her cousin Yang Zhi. He agreed.

In 273, Emperor Wu would undertake a selection of beautiful women from throughout the empire—a warning sign of what would eventually come. He looked most attentively at the daughters of high officials, but he also ordered that no marriages take place across the empire until the selection process was done.

Middle reign: unification of the Chinese empire
In 276, Emperor Wu suffered a major illness—which led to a succession crisis. Crown Prince Zhong would be the legitimate heir, but both the officials and the people hoped that Emperor Wu's capable brother, Sima You, the Prince of Qi, would inherit the throne instead. After Emperor Wu became well, he divested some military commands from officials that he thought favored Prince You, but otherwise took no other punitive actions against anyone.

Later that year, Yang Hu reminded Emperor Wu of his plan to conquer Eastern Wu. Most of the officials, still concerned with Tufa's rebellion, were opposed, but Yang was supported by Du Yu and Zhang. Emperor Wu considered their counsel seriously but did not implement it at this time.

Also in 276, pursuant to his promise to the deceased Empress Yang, Emperor Wu married his cousin Yang Zhi and made her empress. The new Empress Yang's father, Yang Jun, became a key official in the administration and became exceedingly arrogant.

In 279, with the general Ma Long (馬隆) having finally put down Tufa's rebellion, Emperor Wu concentrated his efforts on Eastern Wu, and commissioned a six-pronged attack led by his uncle Sima Zhou, Wang Hun (王渾), Wang Rong, Hu Fen (胡奮), Du Yu, and Wang Jun, with the largest forces under Wang Hun and Wang Jun. Each of the Jin forces advanced quickly and captured the border cities that they were targeting, with Wang Jun's fleet heading east down the Yangtze and clearing the river of Eastern Wu fleets. The Eastern Wu chancellor Zhang Ti (張悌) made a last-ditch attempt to defeat Wang Hun's force, but was defeated and killed. Wang Hun, Wang Jun, and Sima Zhou each headed for Jianye, and Sun Hao was forced to surrender in spring 280.  Emperor Wǔ made Sun Hao the Marquess of Guiming.  The integration of former Eastern Wu territory into Jin appeared to have been a relatively smooth process.

After the fall of Eastern Wu, Emperor Wu ordered that provincial governors no longer be in charge of military matters and become purely civilian governors, and that regional militias be disbanded, despite opposition by the general Tao Huang and the key official Shan Tao. This would also eventually prove to create problems later on during the Wu Hu rebellions, as the regional governors were not able to raise troops to resist quickly enough. He also rejected advice to have the non-Han gradually moved outside of the empire proper.

Late reign: setting the stage for disasters
In 281, Emperor Wu took 5,000 women from Sun Hao's palace into his own, and thereafter became even more concentrated on feasting and enjoying the women, rather than on important matters of state. It was said that there were so many beautiful women in the palace that he did not know whom he should have sexual relations with; he therefore rode on a small cart drawn by goats, and wherever the goats would stop, he would stop there, as well. Because of this, many of the women planted bamboo leaves and salt outside their bedrooms—both items said to be favored by goats. Empress Yang's father Yang Jun and uncles Yang Yao (楊珧) and Yang Ji (楊濟) became effectively in power.

Emperor Wu also became more concerned about whether his brother Prince You would seize the throne if he died. In 282, he sent Prince You to his principality, even though there was no evidence that Prince You had such ambitions. Princess Jingzhao and Princess Changshan kow-towed and begged Emperor Wu to rescind his order, but he merely grew angry and demoted Princess Changshan's husband in retaliation. Prince You, in anger, grew ill and died in 283.

Following previous Roman embassies in 166 and 226, the Book of Jin and Wenxian Tongkao record another embassy from "Da Qin" appearing in China during the reign of Emperor Wu. These histories assert that it arrived in 284 and presented tributary gifts to the emperor.

As Emperor Wu grew ill in 289, he considered whom to make regent. He considered both Yang Jun and his uncle Sima Liang the Prince of Ru'nan, the most respected of the imperial princes. As a result, Yang Jun became fearful of Sima Liang and had him posted to the key city of Xuchang. Several other imperial princes were also posted to other key cities in the empire. By 290, Emperor Wu resolved to let Yang and Sima Liang both be regents, but after he wrote his will, the will was seized by Yang Jun, who instead had another will promulgated in which Yang alone was named regent. Emperor Wu died soon thereafter, leaving the empire in the hands of a developmentally disabled son and nobles intent on shedding each other's blood for power, and while he would not see the disastrous consequences himself, the consequences would soon come.

Era names
 Taishi 265–274
 Xianning 275–280
 Taikang 280–289
 Taixi 28 January 290 – 16 May 290

Family
Consorts and Issue:
 Empress Wuyuan, of the Yang clan of Hongnong (238–274), personal name Yan
 Sima Gui, Prince Dao of Piling, first son
 Sima Zhong, Emperor Xiaohui (259–307), second son
 Sima Jian, Prince Xian of Qin (262–291), third son
 Princess Pingyang
 Princess Xinfeng
 Princess Yangping
 Empress Wudao, of the Yang clan of Hongnong (259–292), personal name Zhi
 Sima Hui, Prince Shang of Bohai (283–284), 24th son
 Empress Dowager Wuhuai, of the Wang clan, personal name Yuanji
 Sima Chi, Emperor Xiaohuai (284–313), 25th son
 Guipin, of the Zuo clan (253–300), personal name Fen
 Guipin, of the Hu clan of Anding, personal name Fang
 Princess Wu'an
 Married Wen Yu
 Furen, of the Li clan
 Sima Yun, Prince Zhongzhuang of Huainan (272–300), tenth son
 Sima Yan, Prince Xiao of Wu (281–311), 23rd son
 Meiren, of the Shen clan
 Sima Jingdu, Prince Huai of Chengyang (d. 270), fourth son
 Sima Wei, Prince Yin of Chu (271–291), ninth son
 Sima Yi, Prince Li of Changsha (277–304), 17th son
 Meiren, of the Zhao clan
 Sima Yan, Prince Ai of Dai (b. 272), 11th son
 Meiren, of the Chen clan
 Sima Xia, Prince Kang of Qinghe (273–300), 13th son
 Cairen, of the Xu clan
 Sima Xian, Prince Shang of Chengyang (270–271), fifth son
 Cairen, of the Gui clan
 Sima Zhi, Prince Chong of Donghai (271–273), sixth son
 Cairen, of the Zhao clan
 Sima Yu, Prince Ai of Shiping (271–277), seventh son
 Cairen, of the Cheng clan
 Sima Ying, Prince of Chengdu (279–306), 19th son
 Baolin, of the Zhuang clan
 Sima Gai, Prince Huai of Xindu (272–283), 12th son
 Lady, of the Zhu clan
 Sima Mo, Prince Ai of Ruyin (276–286), 14th son
 Unknown
 Princess Changshan
 Married Wang Ji of Taiyuan
 Princess Fanchang
 Married Wei Xuan of Hedong, the fourth son of Wei Guan
 Princess Xiangcheng
 Married Wang Dun of Langya, Duke Wuchang (266–324)
 Princess Wannian
 Princess Xingyang
 Princess Xingyang
 Married Hua Heng (267–335)
 Princess Yingchuan
 Married Wang Cui (d. 308) in 289
 Princess Guangping
 Princess Lingshou

Ancestry

See also
Chinese emperors family tree (early)
Family tree of Sima Yi
Lists of people of the Three Kingdoms
List of Chinese monarchs

References

236 births
290 deaths
Cao Wei regents
Jin dynasty (266–420) emperors
3rd-century Chinese monarchs
Cao Wei generals
Usurpers
Founding monarchs